The Amata Friendship Cup is a team golf tournament for male and female professional and amateur golfers contested by teams representing Thailand and Japan. It is the first mixed-gender team event for professional and amateur golfers with a similar format to the Ryder Cup (male event; the USA versus Europe) and Solheim Cup (female event; the USA versus Europe). The teams consist of five male professionals, five female professionals, one male amateur, and one female amateur. It was first played in 2018 at the Amata Spring Country Club which hosted the Honda LPGA Thailand on the LPGA Tour in 2006.

The current holders are Thailand who won in 2018 at the Amata Spring Country Club in Chonburi, Thailand, by a score of 15 to 13.

Founding of the Cup
On 27 August 2018, it was announced by the chairman of the Board of Directors of Amata Spring Country Club, Arsa Sarasin and Senior Executive Vice President Toyota Motor Thailand, Vudhigorn Suriyachantananont, in a press conference at Grand Hyatt Erawan Bangkok, that the inaugural Amata Friendship Cup Presented by Toyota would be held at Amata Spring Country Club, Chonburi, Thailand. The first edition was contested by the teams representing Thailand and Japan for celebrating the relationship between Thailand and Japan. It used the format of the Ryder Cup and Solheim Cup, but it also included amateur golfers in the tournament.

Format
The cup is played over three days. Since 2018, there have been 28 matches: eight foursomes, eight four-balls and 12 singles on the final day. This is the same format as the Ryder Cup and Solheim Cup.

Captains
Team captains are typically recently retired men and women professional golfers, chosen for their experience and for their ability to lead a team.

Results

See also
Dynasty Cup, a men's professional team golf competition between teams representing Asia and Japan.

References

 
Team golf tournaments
Women's golf tournaments
Golf tournaments in Thailand
Recurring sporting events established in 2018